An Arabic-based creole language, or simply Arabic creole is a creole language which was significantly influenced by the Arabic language.

The main Arabic creoles are:

 Juba Arabic: An Arabic-based pidgin or creole, spoken mainly in Equatoria Province in South Sudan.
 Nubi: An Arabic-based creole spoken by descendants of Sudanese soldiers mainly in Kenya and Uganda, formed in the nineteenth century from a Sudanese Arabic-based pidgin used for intercommunication among Southern Sudanese ethnic groups.

Both are descended from Bimbashi Arabic, a pidgin spoken by military troops in Anglo-Egyptian Sudan.

See also
Pidgin Arabic
Varieties of Arabic

References
Manfredi, Stefano and Mauro Tosco (eds.) 2014. Arabic-based Pidgins and Creoles. Special Issue of the Journal of Pidgin and Creole Languages, 29:2